Hypatopa inconspicua is a moth in the family Blastobasidae. It is found in the United States, including California.

The wingspan is 13 to 14 mm. The ground colour of the forewings is pale cinereous (ash-gray), dusted with greyish brown. The hind wings are shining purplish gray.

References

Moths described in 1907
Hypatopa